This was the first edition of the tournament. The tournament originated as a quick replacement for the 2022 edition of the Quito Challenger, which was moved to Cali due to political unrest in Quito.

Malek Jaziri and Adrián Menéndez Maceiras won the title after defeating Keegan Smith and Evan Zhu 7–5, 6–4 in the final.

Seeds

Draw

References

External links
 Main draw

Cali Open - Doubles